Maulvi Liaquat Ali (1817-1892) was a Muslim religious leader from Allahabad (Prayagraj), in the state of Uttar Pradesh in present-day India. He was one of the leaders in the revolt against the British in 1857, in what is now known as the  First Indian war of Independence, or the uprising of 1857. As one of the most prominent leaders, Maulvi Liaqat Ali belonged to Village Mahgaon in Pargana Chail of District Prayagraj. He was a religious teacher, an upright pious Muslim, and a man of great courage and valour. His family traced their descent from the Zainabi Jafri branch of Hashmis which had their offshoots at Jaunpur and other places. He was a humble and simple man but when he took the reins of the freedom struggle, he became a dreadful enemy of the British.

The Zamindars of Chail were his relatives and followers, and they supported Maulvi with their men and ammunition. Consequently, it was with great difficulty that the British regained control of the city of Allahabad after the Maulvi captured the  Khusro Bagh and declared the independence of India Khusro Bagh became the headquarters of the sepoys under Maulvi Liaquat Ali who took charge as the Governor of liberated Allahabad. however, the Mutiny was swiftly put down and Khusro Bagh was retaken by the British in two weeks.

He escaped from Allahabad with a few  Friends and rebel sepoys after the British recaptured the city, but was caught after 14 years in September 1871 at Byculla railway station in Mumbai. He was tried and sentenced to death, but died in captivity in Rangoon (Present-day Yangon) on 17 May 1892. He had married and had a daughter. Her descendants and further generations are still found in and around Pargana Chail and some migrated to Pakistan after independence. The famous Amelia Horne (also known as Amy Horne and Amelia Bennett) was a 17-year-old survivor of the alleged Siege of Cawnpore.  She was a witness for the 1872 trial of Liaquat Ali, and was presented in Liaquat Ali's defense as he saved her life. Liaqat Ali was sentenced to life in prison at Port Blair, in one of the Cellular Jail in Andaman Islands. He had a daughter named Amtullah Bibi who then had a son Hafiz Nazir Ahmed. Hafiz Nazir Ahmed had two sons and three daughters the sons (Zamir Ahmed Jafri & Zaheer Ahmed Jafri) later migrated to Pakistan after its creation in 1947. Elder Zamir Ahmed Jafri had three sons who all are settled in pakistan. With half the family settled in mehngao India and half in karachi pakistan.

References

1817 births
1892 deaths
19th-century Indian Muslims
Indian people who died in prison custody
Prisoners and detainees of British India
Revolutionaries of the Indian Rebellion of 1857
Indian independence activists from Uttar Pradesh
Indian Islamic religious leaders